Colobothea schmidti is a species of beetle in the family Cerambycidae. It was described by Bates in 1865. It is known from Argentina and Brazil.

References

schmidti
Beetles described in 1865
Beetles of South America